The fourth edition of the Women's Strade Bianche was held on 3 March 2018. It was the first leg of the 2018 UCI Women's World Tour. The race was run in abysmal weather and was won by Dutch rider Anna van der Breggen of the  team, after an attack on the penultimate gravel sector of Colle Pinzuto at 17 km from the finish.

Teams
Twenty-four teams entered the race. Each team had a maximum of six riders:

Results

See also
 2018 in women's road cycling
 2018 UCI Women's World Tour

References

External links

Strade Bianche
Strade Bianche
Strade Bianche
Strade Bianche Women